Thomas Leslie Taylor (7 September 1911 – 22 November 1992) was an English professional rugby league footballer who played in the 1930s and 1940s.

Background
Tommy Taylor was born in Fitzwilliam, West Yorkshire, England, he was married with three sons, and he was a miner for all of his working life.

Playing career

International honours
Tommy Taylor won a cap for England while at Castleford in 1945 against Wales.

County honours
Tommy Taylor won caps playing left-, i.e. number 8 for Yorkshire while at Castleford in the 16–5 victory over Lancashire at Widnes' stadium on 12 October 1935, the 16–16 draw with Lancashire at Swinton's stadium on 10 October 1945, and scoring 1-try in the 45–3 victory over Cumberland at Leeds' stadium on 31 October 1945.

County League appearances
Taylor played in Castleford's victories in the Yorkshire County League during the 1932–33 season and 1938–39 season.

Challenge Cup Final appearances
Taylor played right-, i.e. number 10, in Castleford's 11–8 victory over Huddersfield in the 1934–35 Challenge Cup Final during the 1934–35 season at Wembley Stadium, London on Saturday 4 May 1935, in front of a crowd of 39,000.

References

External links

1911 births
1992 deaths
Castleford Tigers players
England national rugby league team players
English miners
English rugby league players
Rugby league players from Wakefield
Rugby league props
Yorkshire rugby league team players